Pier Luigi Carafa (died 7 August 1672) was a Roman Catholic prelate who served as Bishop of Tricarico (1646–1672).

Biography
On 8 January 1646, he was appointed during the papacy of Pope Alexander VII as Bishop of Tricarico.
On 14 January 1646, he was consecrated bishop by Pier Luigi Carafa (seniore), Cardinal-Priest of Santi Silvestro e Martino ai Monti, with Ranuccio Scotti Douglas, Bishop of Borgo San Donnino, and Ascanio Cassiani, Bishop of Andria, serving as co-consecrators. 
He served as Bishop of Tricarico until his death on 7 August 1672. 
While bishop, he was the principal co-consecrator of Giovanni Battista Brescia, Bishop of Vicenza (1655).

References

External links and additional sources
 (for Chronology of Bishops) 
 (for Chronology of Bishops) 

17th-century Italian Roman Catholic bishops
Bishops appointed by Pope Alexander VII
1660 deaths